Sarkesh or Sarkash or Serkesh may refer to:
 Sarkesh, Varzaqan